Rok Stipčević (born May 20, 1986) is a Croatian professional basketball player for Krka of the Slovenian League.

Professional career
Stipčević grew up in Zadar, Croatia, where he started to play basketball for KK Zadar, joining the senior team in 2003. In season 2005/06 he was loaned to KK Borik Puntamika. He played for Pallacanestro Varese in 2010–11 season. Stipičević is of Arbanasi (Albanian) origin.

On July 11, 2012, he signed one season with an option for a second one with Emporio Armani Milano. He left them in January 2013, and signed with Scavolini Pesaro until the end of the season. In September 2013, he signed a one-year deal with Tofaş S.K. In September 2014 he signed with the Italian side Virtus Roma.

On July 14, 2015, Stipčević signed a one-year contract with the Italian club Dinamo Sassari.

After spending most of the 2019–19 season playing for Rytas Vilnius in the Lithuanian League, in June 2019 Stiočević signed a two-year deal with Fortitudo Bologna. He averaged 3.5 points and 1.7 assist per game. On August 18, 2020, he signed with Krka.

International career
He was a member of the Croatian Junior National Teams U16, U18, U20, and is a current member of the senior's National Team of Croatia. With them, he participated in the 2010 World Championship and the 2011 European Championship. He also represented Croatia at the EuroBasket 2015, where they were eliminated in the eighth finals by Czech Republic.

References

External links

Rok Stipčević at abaliga.com
Rok Stipčević at euroleague.net
Rok Stipčević at fiba.com

1986 births
Living people
ABA League players
Arbanasi people
Basketball players at the 2016 Summer Olympics
Basketball players from Zadar
BC Rytas players
Competitors at the 2009 Mediterranean Games
Croatian expatriate basketball people in Italy
Croatian expatriate basketball people in Turkey
Croatian men's basketball players
Croatian people of Albanian descent
Dinamo Sassari players
Fortitudo Pallacanestro Bologna players
KK Borik Puntamika players
KK Cibona players
KK Krka players
KK Zadar players
Lega Basket Serie A players
Mediterranean Games gold medalists for Croatia
Mediterranean Games medalists in basketball
Olimpia Milano players
Olympic basketball players of Croatia
Pallacanestro Varese players
Pallacanestro Virtus Roma players
Point guards
Sportspeople from Maribor
Tofaş S.K. players
Victoria Libertas Pallacanestro players
2010 FIBA World Championship players